The following is a list of cult television shows organized alphabetically:

0-9 
24 (2001–2010; 2014)
30 Rock (2006–2013)
90 Day Fiancé (2014–present)

A 
Absolutely Fabulous (1992–1996; 2001–2004)
The Adam and Joe Show (1996-2001)
Adventure Time (2010–2018)
The Adventures of Brisco County, Jr. (1993–1994)
The Adventures of Pete & Pete (1991–1996)
Æon Flux (1991-1995)
Alias (2001–2006)
Alone (2015–present)
The Amazing World of Gumball (2011-2019)
The Andy Dick Show (2001–2002)
Angel (1999–2004)
Aqua Teen Hunger Force (2001–2015)
Archer (2009–present)
Are You Afraid of the Dark? (1992–1996)
Arrested Development (2003–2006; 2013–2019)
Arrow (2012–2020)
Avatar: The Last Airbender (2005–2008)
The Avengers (1961–1969)

B 
Babylon 5 (1994–1999)
Battlestar Galactica (2004–2009)
Baywatch (1989–2001)
Beauty and the Beast (1987–1990)
The Ben Stiller Show (1992–1995)
Better Off Ted (2009–2010)
The Black Adder (1983)
Black Books (2000–2004)
Blake's 7 (1978–1981)
Broad City (2014–2019)
Buffy the Vampire Slayer (1997–2003)

C 
Charmed (1998–2006)
The Colbert Report (2005–2014)
The Comeback (2005; 2014)
Community (2009–2015)
Cowboy Bebop (1998–2000)
Crazy Ex-Girlfriend (2015–2019)
The Critic (1994–1995)
Curb Your Enthusiasm (2000–present)

D 
Da Ali G Show (2000–2004)
The Daily Show (1996–present)
The Dana Carvey Show (1996)
Daria (1997–2002)
Dark (2017–2020)
Dark Shadows (1966–1971)
Darkwing Duck (1991–1992)
Deadwood (2004–2006)
Degrassi Junior High (1987–1989)
Dexter (2006–2013; 2021–2022)
A Different World (1987–1993)
Difficult People (2015–2017)
Doctor Who (1963–1989; 2005–present)
Don't Hug Me I'm Scared (2011-2016; 2022-present)
Dragon Ball Z (1989–1996)

E 
Eagleheart (2011–2014)
Eerie, Indiana (1991–1992)
The Ernie Kovacs Show (1952–1956; 1961–1962)
The Expanse (2015–2022)

F 
Family Guy (1999–2003; 2005–present)
Farscape (1999–2003)
Father Ted (1995–1998) 
Fawlty Towers (1975–1979)
Fernwood 2 Night (1977)
Firefly (2002)
Fishing with John (1991)
Fraggle Rock (1983–1987)
Freaks and Geeks (1999–2000)
Fringe (2008–2013)
Frisky Dingo (2006–2008)
Futurama (1999–2003; 2008–2013)

G 
Galavant (2015–2016)
Gargoyles (1994–1997)
Garth Marenghi's Darkplace (2004)
Get a Life (1990–1992)
Gilligan's Island (1964–1967)
Gilmore Girls (2000–2007)
The Golden Girls (1985–1992)

H 
Halt and Catch Fire (2014–2017)
Hannibal (2013–2015)
Happy Endings (2011–2013)
He-Man and the Masters of the Universe (1983–1985)
Heroes (2006–2010)
Home Movies (1999; 2001–2004)
H.R. Pufnstuf (1969)

I 
The Idiot Box (1991)
I'm Alan Partridge (1997–2002)
The Inbetweeners (2008-2010)
Invader Zim (2001-2006)
Iron Chef (1993–1999)
The IT Crowd (2006–2013)
It's Always Sunny in Philadelphia (2005–present)
It's Garry Shandling's Show (1986–1990)

J 
Jericho (2006–2008)
The Joy of Painting (1983–1994)

K 
Key & Peele (2012–2015)
Kid Nation  (2007)
The Kids in the Hall (1988–1995)
Kolchak: The Night Stalker (1974–1975)

L 
Late Night with David Letterman (1982–1993)
The League (2009–2015)
The League of Gentlemen (1999–2002; 2017)
The Life & Times of Tim (2008–2013)
Life on Mars (2006–2007)
Lodge 49 (2018–2019)
Lost (2004–2010)
Lost in Space (1965–1968)
Love After Lockup (2018–present)
Lucha Underground (2014–2018)

M 
Mary Hartman, Mary Hartman (1976–1977)
Max Headroom (1987–1988)
Miami Vice (1984–1990)
The Mighty Boosh (2004–2007)
Mr. Show with Bob and David (1995–1998)
Monty Python's Flying Circus (1969–1974)
My Little Pony: Friendship Is Magic (2010–2019)
My So-Called Life (1994–1995)
Mystery Science Theater 3000 (1988–1999; 2017–2018)

N 
Neon Genesis Evangelion (1995–1996)
The Newsroom (2012–2014)
Not Necessarily the News (1983–1990)

O 
The OA (2016–2019)
The O.C. (2003–2007)
The Office (UK series) (2001–2003)
The Office (U.S.A. series) (2005–2013)
Orphan Black (2013–2017)
Outlander (2014–present)
Oz (1997–2003)

P 
Parks and Recreation (2009–2015)
Party Down (2009–2010)
Pee-wee's Playhouse (1986–1990)
Peep Show (2003–2015)
Pinky and the Brain (1995–1998)
Police Squad! (1982)
Popular (1999–2001)
Portlandia (2011–2018)
The Prisoner (1967–1968)
Pushing Daisies (2007–2009)

Q 
Quantum Leap (1989–1993)
Queer as Folk (1999–2000)

R 
Red Dwarf (1988–1999; 2009–present)
The Red Green Show (1991–2006)
The Ren & Stimpy Show (1991–1996)
Rocko's Modern Life (1993–1996)
Roswell (1999–2002)

S 
Sailor Moon (1992–1997)
Saved by the Bell (1989–1993)
Scream Queens (2015–2016)
Scrubs (2001–2010)
SCTV (1976–1984)
Selfie (2014)
Sense8 (2015–2018)
The Simpsons (1989–present)
Sledge Hammer! (1986–1988)
Smallville (2001–2011)
Sonic the Hedgehog (1993–1994)
South Park (1997–present)
Space Ghost Coast to Coast (1994–2004; 2006–2008)
Spaced (1999–2001)
Sports Night (1998–2000)
Stargate SG-1 (1997–2007)
Star Trek (1966–1969)
Star Trek: The Next Generation (1987–1994)
The State (1993–1995)
Still Game (2002–2019)
Strangers with Candy (1999–2000)
Stella (2005)
Supernatural (2005–2020)

T 
Tenacious D (1997–2000)
The Thick of It (2005–2012)
This Life (1996–1997)
The Tick (1994–1996)
Tim and Eric Awesome Show, Great Job! (2007–2010)
Torchwood (2006–2011)
Trailer Park Boys (2001–2008; 2014–present)
True Blood (2008–2014)
TV Funhouse (1996–2011)
The Twilight Zone (1959–1964)
Twin Peaks (1990–1991)
Twitch City (1998–2000)

U 
Ultraviolet (1998)
Undeclared (2001–2002)
Unreal (2015–2018)
Upright Citizens Brigade (1998–2000)
Utopia (2013–2014)

V 
Veronica Mars (2004–2007)

W 
The Walking Dead (2010–present)
The Wire (2002–2008)
Wonder Showzen (2005–2006)
Wonderfalls (2004)

X 
The X-Files (1993–2002; 2016–2018)
Xena: Warrior Princess (1995–2001)

Y 
The Young Ones (1982–1984)

See also 
List of cult films
Cult following
Cult film

References 

Film and video fandom
Television
Lists of television series